Undera Football Club is an Australian rules football club located in Undera, Victoria.

History

The first recorded football matches for Undera Football Club were in 1888, when Undera played several matches against Kyabram.

Undera competed in the Goulburn Valley Football Association from 1890 to 1893 and defeated Mooroopna in the 1891 – Grand Final for the Elder's Hotel (Undera) Elder Medals. In one match in 1891, Undera defeated Mooroopna by scoring the only goal in wet and wild weather.

Undera played in the Goulburn Valley District Football Association from 1894 to 1900.

There is very little football information available on the Undera FC between 1901 and 1912.

Undera played in the Kyabram District Junior Football Association from 1913 to 1922.

Undera were defeated by the Kyabram Imperials the 1913 Kyabram District Junior Football Association grand final.

In July 1915, the Kyabram District Junior Football Association was abandoned due to World War II.

In 1920, Undera, minor premiers, were to have played Tongala in the grand final, but floods prevented this match. Tongala apparently won this match?

In 1922, Undera lost the Kyabram District Junior Football Association to Wyuna, but Undera then won a protest for a replay, in which Wyuna won the match again, and again Undera appealed to the VFL. Finally the grand final was ordered to replayed for the third time on Saturday, 23 December 1922, in which Undera officials stated that it would not be possible.

Undera played in the Ardmona Junior Football Association from 1923 to 1925.

Undera FC won the 1925 Ardmona Junior Football Association premiership.

A senior football team was entered in the newly formed Goulburn Valley Second Eighteens Football Association in 1926 and played in this competition until 1936.

Undera played in the Goulburn Valley Football Association from 1937 to 1939.

Undera withdrew from the GVFA at their 1940 AGM and entered the Kyabram & District Football League in 1940.

Undera FC went into recess between 1941 and 1945, due to World War II.

Undera played in the Kyabram & District Football League in 1946 and 1947, winning back to back senior football premierships.

Undera played in the Central Goulburn Valley Football League Seconds competition in 1948 (minor premiers) and 1949 (minor premiers), but failed in the finals in both seasons.

Undera played in the Central Goulburn Valley Football League Senior competition between 1950 and 1952.

In early 1953, after the Central Goulburn Valley Football League folded, Undera sold all their jumpers and property and amalgamated with Mooroopna Football Club.

Undera joined the Kyabram & District Football Association in 1954.

The Undera Football Club's nickname is "The Lions".

2019 Executive Committee
President: Corey Turvey
Vice President: Bart Van Ruiswyk
Secretary: Simon Delahenty
Treasurer: Sherryn Wall
Football Director: Glenn Campbell
Netball Director: Simone Elder

2019 General Committee
Julie Batey
Jonno Holthuisen
Jordan Jondahl
Thomas LaPorta
Myles Nicholl
Jack O'Brien

Football Premierships
Seniors
Goulburn Valley Football Association
1891
? Football Association
1906
? Football Association
1908
Ardmona Central Junior Football Association
1925
Goulburn Valley Second Eighteens Football Association
1930
Kyabram District Football Association
1946, 1947, 1955
Kyabram District Football League
1962, 1968, 1972, 1997, 2009

Reserves
Kyabram District Football League
2009, 2013

Under 18's
Kyabram District Football League
1977, 1985

Football League – Best & Fairest Winners
Seniors
Kyabram District Football League – McNamara Medal
1947: Bryan Tyndall
1960: J Sellwood
1962: J Neal
1967: P Sleeth
1973: P Sleeth
1974: P Sleeth
1980: C Gundrill
1997: L O'Brien

References

Kyabram & District Football League clubs
1888 establishments in Australia
Australian rules football clubs established in 1888